Simon Marshall is an Australian former jockey and media personality.

He often appears in the media as part of horse-racing functions and once hosted a radio show on SEN 1116 with Tony Jones. He also appeared as a reporter for Seven Network's AFL GameDay program.

Marshall wrote a biography, Hold ya Horses - laughs, highs and Wild times of Simon Marshall.

References

Year of birth missing (living people)
Living people
Jockeys from Melbourne